John Mitchell Bruce  (1846–1929) was a British physician, pathologist, and physiologist.

Biography
After education at Aberdeen Grammar School, J. Mitchell Bruce matriculated at the University of Aberdeen, where he graduated MA in 1866. He studied medicine at the Middlesex Hospital, graduating MB (Lond.) in 1870. He undertook postgraduate study in pathology at Vienna and at London's Brown Animal Sanatory Institution under John Burdon-Sanderson and Edward Emanuel Klein. Bruce briefly held a junior appointment at Aberdeen Royal Infirmary before he was appointed in 1871 lecturer in physiology at Charing Cross Hospital. There he became in 1873 assistant physician, in 1882 full physician, and in 1904 consulting physician upon his retirement. He relinquished his physiological lectureship in 1877, taught materia medica from 1877 to 1890, and medicine from 1890 to 1901.

Bruce was dean of the Charing Cross Hospital Medical School from 1883 to 1890. He was physician to Royal Brompton Hospital for twenty years.

Bruce was married and had one son.

Awards and honours
 1878 — FRCP
 1901 — Lettsomian Lecturer on Diseases and Disorders of the Heart and Arteries in Middle and Advanced Life
 1911 — Lumleian Lecturer on Cardio-Vascular Degeneration
 1913 — Harveian Orator
 1919 — CVO

Selected publications

References

1846 births
1929 deaths
19th-century Scottish medical doctors
20th-century Scottish medical doctors
People educated at Aberdeen Grammar School
Alumni of the University of Aberdeen
Alumni of Charing Cross Medical School
Physicians of Charing Cross Hospital
Fellows of the Royal College of Physicians
Commanders of the Royal Victorian Order
Fellows of the Royal College of Physicians of Ireland